Nebo may refer to:

In religion and mythology
 Nebo (biblical town), a Biblical town
 Mount Nebo, place for biblical events
 Nebo (god), a Babylonian god

Places

Australia
 Nebo, Queensland, a town in coastal Queensland
 Shire of Nebo, Queensland

Ivory Coast
 Nébo, a town and sub-prefecture in Gôh-Djiboua District

South Africa
 Nebo, Limpopo, a town

United States
 Nebo, Georgia, an unincorporated community in Paulding County
 Nebo, Illinois, a village
 Nebo, Kentucky, a city
 Nebo, Louisiana, a small town; see Jena High School
 Nebo, Missouri, an unincorporated community
 Nebo, North Carolina, an unincorporated community
 Nebo, Ohio, an extinct town
 Nebo (Struthers, Ohio), a neighborhood in Mahoning County
 Nebo, Virginia, an unincorporated community
 Nebo, Clay County, West Virginia, an unincorporated community
 Nebo, Upshur County, West Virginia, an unincorporated community
 Nebo Center, California,  neighborhood and former census-designated place in Barstow
 Nebo National Forest, Utah
 Nebo School District, a school district in Utah County, Utah

Wales
 Nebo, Anglesey, a hamlet
 Nebo, Ceredigion, a location in the U.K.
 Nebo, Conwy, a small village near Betws-y-Coed
 Nebo, Gwynedd, a village

Multiple countries
 Mount Nebo (disambiguation)

Music
  "Nebo" (Anastasiya Petryk song)
 "Nebo" (Nina Badric song)

People
Josh Nebo (born 1997), American basketball player in the Israeli Premier League

Other uses
 Nebo-M a Russian system of several different radars
 Nebo (scorpion), a genus of scorpions
 Nebo Road (Hamilton, Ontario), Canada

See also
 
 Nebos, a German Thoroughbred racehorse